Forest Dewey Dodrill (January 26, 1902 – June 28, 1997) was a medical doctor at Harper University Hospital at Wayne State University in Michigan who performed the first successful open heart surgery using a mechanical pump.

Biography
Dodrill was born in Webster Springs, West Virginia and attended West Virginia University, where he earned his bachelor's degree in 1925, he attended Harvard Medical School, graduating in 1930. Dodrill was an intern and resident at Harper Hospital in Detroit where he became a staff surgeon. He did a thoracic surgical residency at the University of Michigan in the early 1940s, receiving a M.Ch. degree from in 1942.

On July 3, 1952, Dodrill completed the first successful open heart surgery on the left ventricle of Henry Opitek. He used a machine developed by himself and researchers at General Motors, the Dodrill-GMR, considered to be the first operational mechanical heart used while performing open heart surgery.

References

1902 births
1997 deaths
American cardiac surgeons
Wayne State University faculty
Harvard Medical School alumni
West Virginia State University alumni
University of Michigan Medical School alumni
20th-century American physicians
People from Webster Springs, West Virginia
20th-century surgeons